Blue chip may refer to:
 Blue casino token
 Blue chip (stock market), a corporation with a national reputation for quality, reliability, and the ability to operate profitably
 Blue chip (sports), collegiate athletes who are targeted by professional sports teams
 Blue Chip Stamps, a trading stamps company
 Blue Chip (album), a 1989 album by Acoustic Alchemy
 Blue Chips, a 1994 film
 Blue Chip Casino, Hotel and Spa, located in Indiana
 Blue chip hacking scandal, a 2008 political scandal involving the use of corrupt private investigators by British "blue chip" companies
 Blue Chip Economic Indicators, a monthly publication of Aspen Publishers with consensus forecasts of the economy of the United States
 Blue Chip Electronics, a defunct American computer company
 Blue Chip series, the 1955-1959 GMC (automobile) versions of Chevrolet Task Force trucks
 Blue Chip Conference, a high school athletic conference in Indiana
Bluechip (software), a voter database used by the Conservative Party in the UK from the mid-1990s to 2009
BlueChip Stadium, a former name for ASB Baypark Stadium in Mount Maunganui, New Zealand
The Blue Chip City, a nickname for Cincinnati

See also
Blue Chips 7000, a 2017 album by Action Bronson
Blue Chips 2, a 2013 mixtape by Action Bronson